Airband or aircraft band is the name for a group of frequencies in the VHF radio spectrum allocated to radio communication in civil aviation, sometimes also referred to as VHF, or phonetically as "Victor". Different sections of the band are used for radionavigational aids and air traffic control.

In most countries a license to operate airband equipment is required and the operator is tested on competency in procedures, language and the use of the phonetic alphabet.

Spectrum usage

The VHF airband uses the frequencies between 108 and 137 MHz. The lowest 10 MHz of the band, from 108 to 117.95 MHz, is split into 200 narrow-band channels of 50 kHz. These are reserved for navigational aids such as VOR beacons, and precision approach systems such as ILS localizers.

, most countries divide the upper 19 MHz into 760 channels for amplitude modulation voice transmissions, on frequencies from 118 to 136.975 MHz, in steps of 25 kHz. In Europe, it is becoming common to further divide those channels into three (8.33 kHz channel spacing), potentially permitting 2,280 channels. Some channels between 123.100 and 135.950 are available in the US to other users such as government agencies, commercial company advisory, search and rescue, military aircraft, glider and ballooning air-to-ground, flight test and national aviation authority use.

Other bands
Aeronautical voice communication is also conducted in other frequency bands, including satellite voice on Inmarsat, Globalstar or Iridium, and high frequency voice. Usually these other frequency bands are only used in oceanic and remote areas, though they work over wider areas or even globally. Military aircraft also use a dedicated UHF-AM band from 225.0 to 399.95 MHz for air-to-air and air-to-ground, including air traffic control communication. This band has a designated emergency and guard channel of 243.0 MHz.

Radio aeronautical navigation aids (navaids) use other frequencies. Non-directional beacons (NDB)s operate on low frequency and medium frequency bands 190–415 kHz and 510–535 kHz. The instrument landing system (ILS) glide path operates in the UHF range of 329.3–335.0 MHz with marker beacons at 75 MHz. Distance measuring equipment (DME) also uses UHF from 962 to 1150 MHz.

Channel spacing
Channel spacing for voice communication on the airband was originally 200 kHz until 1947, providing 70 channels from 118 to 132 MHz. Some radios of that time provided receive-only coverage below 118 MHz for a total of 90 channels. From 1947 to 1958 the spacing became 100 kHz; from 1954 split once again to 50 kHz and the upper limit extended to 135.95 MHz (360 channels), and then to 25 kHz in 1972 to provide 720 usable channels. On 1 January 1990 the frequencies between 136.000 and 136.975 MHz were added, resulting in 760 channels.

Increasing air traffic congestion has led to further subdivision into narrow-band 8.33 kHz channels in the ICAO European region; since 2007, all aircraft flying above FL195 are required to have communication equipment for this channel spacing. Outside of Europe, 8.33 kHz channels are permitted in many countries but not widely used as of 2012.

The emergency communication channel 121.5 MHz is the only channel that retains 100 kHz channel spacing in the US; there are no channel allocations between 121.4 and 121.5 or between 121.5 and 121.6

Modulation
Aircraft communications radio operations worldwide use amplitude modulation, predominantly A3E double sideband with full carrier on VHF and UHF, and J3E single sideband with suppressed carrier on HF. Besides being simple, power-efficient and compatible with legacy equipment, AM and SSB permit stronger stations to override weaker or interfering stations. Additionally, this method does not suffer from the capture effect found in FM. Even if a pilot is transmitting, a control tower can "talk over" that transmission and other aircraft will hear a somewhat garbled mixture of both transmissions, rather than just one or the other. Even if both transmissions are received with identical signal strength, a heterodyne will be heard where no such indication of blockage would be evident in an FM system.

Alternative analog modulation schemes are under discussion, such as the "CLIMAX" multi-carrier system and offset carrier techniques to permit more efficient utilization of spectrum.

Audio properties
The audio quality in the airband is limited by the RF bandwidth used. In the newer channel spacing scheme, the largest bandwidth of an airband channel is limited to 8.33 kHz, so the highest possible audio frequency is 4.166 kHz. In the 25 kHz channel spacing scheme, an upper audio frequency of 12.5 kHz would be theoretically possible. However, most airband voice transmissions never actually reach these limits. Usually, the whole transmission is contained within a 6 kHz to 8 kHz bandwidth, corresponding to an upper audio frequency of 3 kHz to 4 kHz. This frequency, while low compared to the top of the human hearing range, is sufficient to convey speech. Different aircraft, control towers and other users transmit with different bandwidths and audio characteristics.

Digital radio
A switch to digital radios has been contemplated, as this would greatly increase capacity by reducing the bandwidth required to transmit speech. Other benefits from digital coding of voice transmissions include decreased susceptibility to electrical interference and jamming. The change-over to digital radio has yet to happen, partly because the mobility of aircraft necessitates complete international cooperation to move to a new system and also the time implementation for subsequent changeover.

Unauthorised use
It is illegal in most countries to transmit on the airband frequencies without a suitable license, although an individual license may not be required, for instance in the US where aircraft stations are "licensed by rule". Many countries' regulations also restrict communications in the airband. For instance, in Canada, airband communications are limited to those required for "the safety and navigation of an aircraft; the general operation of the aircraft; and the exchange of messages on behalf of the public. In addition, a person may operate radio apparatus only to transmit a non-superfluous signal or a signal containing non-profane or non-obscene radiocommunications."

Listening to airband frequencies without a license is also an offense in some countries.  However, in certain countries, such as the UK, it is permissible to listen to as it is covered under navigational and weather related transmissions. Such activity has been the subject of international situations between governments when tourists bring airband equipment into countries which ban the possession and use of such equipment.

See also
ACARS
Air traffic flow management
Avionics
Control tower
Future Air Navigation System
Line-of-sight propagation

References

Airbands